Charles David  Walker  (born August 10, 1941) was a defensive tackle who played 12 seasons in the National Football League (NFL) for the St. Louis Cardinals and the Atlanta Falcons. 

Walker attended Duke University and was the Cardinals' twelfth-round selection in the 1963 NFL Draft. Walker earned Pro Bowl honors in 1966 and his best season came in 1967 when he led the Cardinals with 12 sacks. He led the NFL with five fumble recoveries in 1969. Walker has the seventh most sacks in Cardinals history with 50.5.

Walker was traded to Atlanta in 1972 where he was a key defensive contributor during the Falcons' first winning season, in 1973.

References

1941 births
Living people
American football defensive tackles
Atlanta Falcons players
Duke Blue Devils football players
St. Louis Cardinals (football) players
Eastern Conference Pro Bowl players
People from Uniontown, Pennsylvania
Players of American football from Pennsylvania